Héctor Torres may refer to:
 Héctor Torres, a former Major League Baseball player
 Héctor Torres Calderón, Puerto Rican politician
 Hector L. Torres, Maryland firefighter and political candidate

Hector Torres may also refer to:
 Hector Torres (lawyer), a named partner at Kasowitz Benson Torres